Hampden County may refer to:
 County of Hampden, Victoria, Australia
 Hampden County, Massachusetts, United States